The 2012–13 season was the 79th season in Real Club Deportivo Mallorca's history and their 16th consecutive season in La Liga, the top division of Spanish football.

Mallorca competed for their first La Liga title after an eighth-place finish in the 2011–12 La Liga. They also entered the Copa del Rey in the Round of 32 and were knocked out in the Round of 16 by Sevilla in a 6–2 aggregate defeat.

Squad
''The numbers are established according to the official website: www.rcdmallorca.es

Out on loan

Competitions

La Liga

League table

Positions by round
The table lists the positions of teams after completion of each round.

Matches

Copa del Rey

Kickoff times are in CET.

Round of 32

Sources

Mallorca
RCD Mallorca seasons